Tímea Babos and Kristina Mladenovic defeated Hsieh Su-wei and Barbora Strýcová in the final, 6–2, 6–1 to win the women's doubles tennis title at the 2020 Australian Open. It was their second Australian Open title together. Despite the loss, Hsieh regained the WTA no. 1 doubles ranking for the first time since 2014, replacing her partner Strýcová. Mladenovic, Aryna Sabalenka and Xu Yifan were also in contention for the top ranking.

Samantha Stosur and Zhang Shuai were the defending champions, but chose not to participate together. Stosur played alongside Ellen Perez, but they lost in the first round to Lara Arruabarrena and Ons Jabeur. Zhang teamed up with Peng Shuai, but they lost to Veronika Kudermetova and Alison Riske, also in the first round.

Seeds

Draw

Finals

Top half

Section 1

Section 2

Bottom half

Section 3

Section 4

Other entry information

Wild cards

Protected ranking

Alternate pairs

Withdrawals
  Johanna Larsson /  Rebecca Peterson

References

External links
Draw
 2020 Australian Open – Women's draws and results at the International Tennis Federation

Women's Doubles
Australian Open (tennis) by year – Women's doubles
Australian Open – Women's Doubles
Australian Open – Women's Doubles
Australian Open – Women's Doubles